King Lie of Zhou, personal name Ji Xi, was the thirty-fourth king of the Chinese Zhou dynasty and the twenty-second of Eastern Zhou. He reigned from 375 BC to his death in 369 BC. His father was King An of Zhou.

Ancestry

See also
 Family tree of ancient Chinese emperors

References 

369 BC deaths
Zhou dynasty kings
4th-century BC Chinese monarchs
Year of birth unknown